Untitled is a public art work by American abstract artist James Rosati located at the Lynden Sculpture Garden near Milwaukee, Wisconsin. The sculpture is an abstract form made of Corten steel; it is installed on the lawn.

References

Outdoor sculptures in Milwaukee
1976 sculptures
Steel sculptures in Wisconsin
Abstract sculptures in Wisconsin
1976 establishments in Wisconsin